Sar Pushideh (also Romanized as Sar Pūshīdeh) is a village in Haparu Rural District, in the Central District of Bagh-e Malek County, Khuzestan Province, Iran. At the 2006 census, its population was 223, in 38 families.

References 

Populated places in Bagh-e Malek County